Solidar Suisse is a Swiss non-governmental organization (NGO) that claims a 70-year commitment to decent working conditions, democratic participation and improvement of living conditions in the poorest countries. It was known as Œuvre suisse d'entraide ouvrière [OSEO] (in French) and as Schweizerisches Arbeiterhilfswerk [SAH] (Swiss Workers Relief Agency, in German) until 2011 at the Swiss level, and again afterwards for its regional branches which became independent.

Solidar has more than 50 projects in 14 countries. In Switzerland, the relief organization runs awareness-raising campaigns. It has 180 employees.

The Swiss Agency for Development and Cooperation (SDC), the cantonal cooperation federations of Vaud (FEDEVACO) and Geneva (FGC) as well as many Swiss cities are among Solidar's partners. The association carries the ZEWO quality label .

History 
The association was created in 1936 by the Swiss Trade Union Association and the Swiss Socialist Party, under the name of the Swiss Worker's Mutual Aid Organization (OSEO). Initially, OSEO's main line of action is to support families and children living in Switzerland in a precarious situation, notably through the funding of holiday camps or the opening of homes.

Very quickly, the association engages in Spain to help the children victims of the Spanish Civil War . During the Second World War, she distributed food parcels in refugee camps in Europe, and took care of more than 2000 refugees on Swiss territory. In the immediate post-war period, the OSEO provides emergency assistance, social support and open homes for children.

From 1951, the association broadens its spectrum of action. Through the creation of the International Workers Foundation section, OSEO undertakes its first development cooperation projects in Palestine and Israel or in the former Yugoslavia .

In the following decades, OSEO maintained its activities in favor of the Swiss population while developing international activities. It supports refugees fleeing civil wars or dictatorships ( Algeria in 1954, Hungary in 1956, Chile and Argentina in the 1970s or Turkey in the 1980s). In parallel, it multiplies the actions of humanitarian aids following natural disasters. OSEO is gradually defining "priority" countries for development cooperation.

In 2011, the International Workers Foundation becomes Solidar Switzerland.

A dozen regional branches of the OSEO, however, continue to develop independently activities related to professional reintegration, training or the integration of migrant people

Locations of activity 

In 2015, Solidar is active in 15 countries: Burkina Faso, Mozambique, South Africa, Kosovo, Bosnia, Serbia, Lebanon, Pakistan, Philippines, Sri Lanka, China, Nepal, Bolivia, Nicaragua and El Salvador.

In Switzerland, ten independent regional Schweizerisches Arbeiterhilfswerk SAH associations (Basel, Berne, Friborg, Geneva, Schaffhausen, Ticino, Vaud, Valais, Central Switzerland, Zurich) are involved in 16 cantons with around 900 employees for disadvantaged people. They provide education, employment and work integration programs for the unemployed and displaced, and provide guidance and assistance to asylum seekers, refugees and migrants.

National campaigns 

Since 2008, Solidar has been conducting national awareness campaigns such as "Responsible Public Purchasing – No to Exploitation with Our Taxes", "For a FIFA and Socially Responsible World Cups", "Fair Toys", on toys that have come from China, "Stop food speculation" or "For pans produced in decent conditions". In 2017 it published material promoting the successful integration of asylum migrants.  It also takes part in the Popular Initiative "Responsible enterprises – to protect the human being and the environment" and carried out, in 2011, 2013 and 2016, an evaluation of the communal policies for development cooperation and fair purchasing. (Solidar Rating of Commons).

Publications 
Solidar publishes four times a year the magazine Solidarity, which reports on its international and national projects, and deals more broadly with themes related to North-South cooperation.

Solidar publishes an annual report every year. The 2014 annual report is available on the official website .

References

External links

   
 Chronique illustrée des actions de l’OSEO de 1936 à 2005
 
 
 Réseau International de Solidar

Organizations established in 1936
Development charities based in Switzerland
Organisations based in Zürich